Tachina compressa is a species of fly in the genus Tachina of the family Tachinidae that can be found in such US states as California, Oregon, and Washington.

References

Insects described in 1924
Diptera of North America
Endemic fauna of the United States
compressa